André Scotti Ossemer (born January 31, 1982) is a Brazilian footballer. He previously playing at the Eerste Divisie with FC Zwolle. In January 2008, he transfer to Sabah FA and playing in Malaysia Premier League. His contract were ended at the end of season after Football Association of Malaysia do not want foreign players for the 2009 season.

External links
André Scotti video at YouTube.com
André Scotti Ossemer interview at Sabahfa.com
Andre Scott Criciuma History (Portuguese)

Living people
Brazilian footballers
1982 births
Sabah F.C. (Malaysia) players
Association football forwards